Stanhopea jenischiana is a species of orchid endemic to Colombia, Peru, Ecuador, and Venezuela. The flowers are 5 cm in diameter, and have an orange-yellow to gold color, with dark chestnut-red spots on the lip and often have a dark color at the base of the petals.

References

External links

jenischiana
Orchids of Colombia
Orchids of Peru
Orchids of Ecuador
Orchids of Venezuela
Taxa named by Alexander von Humboldt
Taxa named by Aimé Bonpland